Medina del Campo AV railway station (Medina del Campo Alta Velocidad) is a railway station serving the Spanish town of Medina del Campo in Castile and León. It is served by the Spanish AVE high-speed rail system, on the partially Madrid–Galicia high-speed rail line.

History
In 2015 Ferrovial announced it would be building the AVE high-speed rail station at Medina del Campo, with 4 tracks and two platforms measuring 400m in length. The station was opened on February 1, 2016, at a cost of €3.6 million.

References

Railway stations in Castile and León
Railway stations in Spain opened in 2016
Buildings and structures in the Province of Valladolid
Medina del Campo